Destiny Nicole Frasqueri (born June 14, 1992), known professionally as Princess Nokia, is an American rapper and songwriter. She released her debut studio album, Metallic Butterfly, in 2014, followed by the 2015 mixtape  Honeysuckle. As Princess Nokia, she rose to prominence for her 2017 studio album 1992 Deluxe. She released another mixtape, titled A Girl Cried Red, in 2018, followed by the release of two studio albums, Everything Sucks and Everything Is Beautiful, in 2020.

Early life 
Frasqueri identifies as Afro-Indigenous, and is of Puerto Rican descent. When Frasqueri was ten, she lost her mother to AIDS. Between the ages of nine and sixteen, she was in foster care, during which her foster mother was physically abusive. After Frasqueri left foster care, she went to live with her grandmother. She subsequently started writing rhymes. Frasqueri lived around East Harlem and the Lower East Side of New York City at the time.

Career

2010–2018: Early career and career beginnings 

In 2010, Frasqueri recorded and released her first song, titled "Destiny", under the stage name Wavy Spice on her SoundCloud page, and later released the song on her YouTube channel in mid-2012. Subsequently, she released her second song, titled "Bitch I'm Posh". She next released "YAYA", a song that chronicles her Taíno ancestry. She later released the singles "Vicki Gotti" and "Versace Hottie". Following the singles, Frasqueri changed her stage name to Princess Nokia, which she claimed was an alter ego, and introduced the character with the song "Nokia". On May 12, 2014, Frasqueri released her debut studio album, titled Metallic Butterfly, which debuted on Vice and SoundCloud. On September 8, 2017, she released her second studio album, 1992 Deluxe, an expanded version of her 2016 mixtape, 1992. It peaked at number 25 on the US Billboards Heatseekers Albums chart. NME listed it as the 32nd best album of 2017.

Nokia debuted a radio show on Apple's Beats 1 Radio on February 18, 2018. Episodes aired every other Sunday and allowed listeners to get acquainted with the inner workings of Nokia's mind. The show has a total of six episodes labeled "The Voices in My Head with Princess Nokia." In September 2018, she was chosen as one of the six ambassadors by Maison Margiela to promote their new fragrance, Mutiny. In December 2018, Nokia released a "remastered and expanded version" of the album Metallic Butterfly, which includes three new bonus tracks. That same year, she released a mixtape titled A Girl Cried Red. Stefanie Fernández of NPR deemed it an expression of Frasqueri's artistic and emotional versatility and praised how she "transcends them."

2019–present: Everything Sucks and Everything Is Beautiful 
In 2019, Nokia had her debut performance as an actress in the independent film Angelfish. In September 2019, she released a song titled "Sugar Honey Iced Tea (S.H.I.T.)". It was described as "a bouncy, empowering bop built around dismissive lyrics about Nokia's enemies." In February 2020, Nokia released two albums: Everything Sucks and Everything Is Beautiful. Pitchfork described Everything Sucks as "locust swarm of angst, restless and frantic" and regarded Everything Is Beautiful as "warm and expansive" in comparison to the former. In March 2021, Nokia released a music video for the song, titled "It's Not My Fault". The single was released through Arista Records and marked the first one Nokia released through a major label.

In 2022, she voiced LaBrea, LaCienega's cousin in The Proud Family: Louder and Prouder.

Artistry 
Nokia's musical style has been described as "experimental" and "eagerly floating between genres such as rap, soul, rock and house." She lists rappers MC Lyte and Queen Latifah, girl group TLC, as well as nu metal bands Korn and Slipknot as musical influences. Nokia also cites hardcore, punk, and rave cultures as influences for her performances.

Personal life 
Frasqueri identifies as bisexual and has stated such in a past interview and has also talked about how growing up near the queer community of New York City was an important part of her life. The early stages of Princess Nokia's musical career began through performing at gay clubs, as she gained popularity among the gay nightlife scene. She also identifies as a gender non-conforming person and uses both they/them and she/her pronouns.

Frasqueri is a strong supporter of intersectional feminism, founding the Smart Girl Club with Milah Libin, a podcast where she discusses healthy living and urban feminism. She is a practitioner of Santería, and has shared her own experience with clairvoyance and spirituality that she infuses her music with.

In 2017, Frasqueri punched a male concertgoer at Cambridge University who she said had been mouthing "dirty obscenities" at her. She later told the crowd that "that's what you do when a white boy disrespects you". Later that year, a video of a woman throwing hot soup in a man's face who was calling "a group of teenage boys" a racial slur whilst on a subway journey to Brooklyn surfaced. Frasqueri took responsibility for the incident, saying that "everybody on the train backed [her] up".

Discography

Studio albums

Extended plays

Mixtapes 
 Honeysuckle (2015, as Destiny)
 1992 (2016)
 A Girl Cried Red (2018)

Singles

As lead artist

As featured artist

Other certified songs

Awards and nominations

See also
 LGBT culture in New York City
 List of LGBT people from New York City
 Nuyorican
 Puerto Ricans in New York City

Notes

References

External links
 
 
 
 
 

1992 births
Living people
21st-century American rappers
21st-century American singers
American feminists
American women hip hop singers
American Santeríans
Bisexual feminists
Bisexual musicians
East Coast hip hop musicians
Feminist rappers
Feminist musicians
Indie rappers
American LGBT musicians
LGBT people from New York (state)
LGBT rappers
People of Afro–Puerto Rican descent
People from East Harlem
People from the Lower East Side
Puerto Rican rappers
Rappers from Manhattan
Trip hop musicians
Underground rappers
Non-binary musicians
21st-century American women
African-American women musicians
21st-century African-American women
21st-century African-American musicians
Hispanic and Latino American rappers
Puerto Rican women rappers
Bisexual non-binary people
21st-century women rappers